Elachista albicapitella is a moth of the family Elachistidae. It is found in North America, where it has been recorded from Illinois, Pennsylvania, Ohio and Nova Scotia.

The wingspan is 8–9 mm. The forewings are silvery white from the base of the costa across to the dorsum. There is a curved silvery-white fascia just beyond one-third of the wing length, as well as a silvery spot just beyond two-thirds. The hindwings are dark brownish fuscous. Adults have been recorded on wing in February and from May to July.

The larvae feed on Poa sylvestris. They mine the leaves of their host plant. The mine starts near the base of the stem of tufts of their host plant. A single larva makes several mines. It may mine down into the leaf sheath, from which it enters another leaf. In later mines the leaf blade becomes rather inflated and the parenchyma nearly all consumed. Mining larvae can be found in early spring. The larvae are pale yellowish.

References

albicapitella
Moths described in 1907
Moths of North America